Akura, is a village in Telavi Municipality of Georgia.

See also
 Telavi Municipality
 Tsinandali

References 

Populated places in Telavi Municipality